Pokémon Wii U may refer to two different video games in the Pokémon series of video games for the Wii U.

Pokémon Rumble U, released in 2013
Pokkén Tournament, released in 2016